AXP may refer to:

Alpha AXP, later known as DEC Alpha, a 64-bit instruction set architecture developed by Digital Equipment Corporation (DEC)
Anomalous X-ray pulsar
American Express, whose NYSE ticker symbol is "AXP"
Alexandra Parade railway station, United Kingdom, whose National Rail code is "AXP"
Alpha Chi Rho, a fraternity whose Greek letters resemble "ΑΧΡ"
Automotive X Prize
The Atheist Experience
Athlon XP, an AMD processor
Architectural Experience Program
Aerial Xpress, a pro wrestling tag team of Scorpio Sky and Quicksilver
Spring Point Airport, whose IATA airport code is "AXP"